Calycomyza malvae is a species of leaf miner fly in the family Agromyzidae.

References

Further reading

External links

 Diptera.info

Agromyzidae
Leaf miners